Georgina Olwen Nelthorpe (born 20 January 1997) is a British freestyle wrestler. She is a two-time bronze medalist at the Commonwealth Games. She won one of the bronze medals in the women's 76 kg event at the 2018 Commonwealth Games and the 2022 Commonwealth Games.

Career 

She won one of the bronze medals in the women's freestyle 76 kg event at the 2018 Commonwealth Games held in Gold Coast, Australia.

In 2019, she competed in the women's freestyle 76 kg event at the European Games held in Minsk, Belarus. She was eliminated in her second match by Sabira Aliyeva of Azerbaijan.

In March 2021, she competed at the European Qualification Tournament in Budapest, Hungary hoping to qualify for the 2020 Summer Olympics in Tokyo, Japan. She was eliminated in her second match by Mariya Oryashkova of Bulgaria. In May 2021, she failed to qualify for the Olympics at the World Olympic Qualification Tournament held in Sofia, Bulgaria. She was eliminated in her second match by María Acosta of Venezuela. In October 2021, she competed in the women's 76 kg event at the World Wrestling Championships held in Oslo, Norway where she was eliminated in her first match.

She won one of the bronze medals in the women's 76 kg event at the 2022 Commonwealth Games held in Birmingham, England.

Achievements

References

External links 
 

Living people
1997 births
British female sport wrestlers
Wrestlers at the 2019 European Games
European Games competitors for Great Britain
Wrestlers at the 2018 Commonwealth Games
Wrestlers at the 2022 Commonwealth Games
Commonwealth Games medallists in wrestling
Commonwealth Games bronze medallists for England
21st-century English women
Medallists at the 2018 Commonwealth Games
Medallists at the 2022 Commonwealth Games